Gian Galeazzo Ciano, 2nd Count of Cortellazzo and Buccari (18 March 1903 – 11 January 1944) was an Italian diplomat and politician who served as Foreign Minister in the government of his father-in-law, Benito Mussolini, from 1936 until 1943. During this period, he was widely seen as Mussolini's most probable successor as head of government.

He was the son of Admiral Costanzo Ciano, a founding member of the National Fascist Party; father and son both took part in Mussolini's March on Rome in 1922. Ciano saw action in the Italo-Ethiopian War (1935–36) and was appointed Foreign Minister on his return. Following a series of Axis defeats in the Second World War, Ciano began pushing for Italy's exit, and he was dismissed from his post as a result. He then served as ambassador to the Vatican.

In July 1943, Ciano was among the members of the Grand Council of Fascism that forced Mussolini's ousting and subsequent arrest. Ciano proceeded to flee to Germany but was arrested and handed over to Mussolini's new regime based in Salo, the Italian Social Republic. Under German pressure, Mussolini ordered Ciano's death, and in January 1944 he was executed by firing squad.

Ciano wrote and left behind a diary that has been used as a source by several historians, including William Shirer in his The Rise and Fall of the Third Reich and in the four-hour HBO documentary-drama Mussolini and I.

Early life
Gian Galeazzo Ciano was born in Livorno, Italy, in 1903. He was the son of Costanzo Ciano and his wife Carolina Pini; his father was an Admiral and World War I hero in the Royal Italian Navy (for which service he was given the aristocratic title of Count by Victor Emmanuel III). The elder Ciano, nicknamed Ganascia ("The Jaw"), was a founding member of the National Fascist Party and re-organizer of the Italian merchant navy in the 1920s. Costanzo Ciano was not above extracting private profit from his public office. He would use his influence to depress the stock of a company, after which he would buy a controlling interest, then increase his wealth after its value rebounded. Among other holdings, Costanzo Ciano owned a newspaper, farmland in Tuscany and other properties worth huge sums of money. As a result, his son Galeazzo was accustomed to living a high-profile and glamorous lifestyle, which he maintained almost until the end of his life. Father and son both took part in Mussolini's 1922 March on Rome.

After studying Philosophy of Law at the University of Rome, Galeazzo Ciano worked briefly as a journalist before choosing a diplomatic career; soon, he served as an attaché in Rio de Janeiro.

On 24 April 1930, when he was 27 years old, he married Benito Mussolini's daughter Edda Mussolini, and they had three children (Fabrizio, Raimonda and Marzio), though he was known to have had several affairs while married. Soon after their marriage, Ciano left for Shanghai to serve as Italian consul, where his wife had an affair with the Chinese warlord Zhang Xueliang. On his return to Italy in 1935, he became the minister of press and propaganda in the government of his father-in-law.

Foreign Minister

Ciano volunteered for action in the Italian invasion of Ethiopia (1935–36) as a bomber squadron commander. He received two silver medals of valor and reached the rank of captain. His future opponent Alessandro Pavolini served in the same squadron as a lieutenant. Upon his highly trumpeted return from the war as a "hero" in 1936, he was appointed by Mussolini as replacement Foreign Minister. Ciano began to keep a diary a short time after his appointment and kept it active up to his 1943 dismissal as foreign minister. In 1937, he was allegedly involved in planning the murder of the brothers Carlo and Nello Rosselli, two exiled anti-fascist activists killed in the French spa town of Bagnoles-de-l'Orne on 9 June. Also in 1937, prior to the Italian annexation in 1939, Gian Galeazzo Ciano was named an Honorary Citizen of Tirana, Albania.

Before World War II, Mussolini may have been preparing Ciano to succeed him as Duce. (In 1938, he sought treatment for his throat ailment, by the famed Jewish professor Heinrich Neumann. As treatment required lengthy time, the Anschluss interrupted and Neumann was jailed as a Jew). At the start of the war in 1939, Ciano did not agree with Mussolini's plans and knew that Italy's armed forces were ill-prepared for a major war. When Mussolini formally declared war on France in 1940, he wrote in his diary, "I am sad, very sad. The adventure begins. May God help Italy!" Ciano became increasingly disenchanted with Nazi Germany and the course of World War II, although when the Italian regime embarked on an ill-advised "parallel war" alongside Germany, he went along, despite the terribly-executed Italian invasion of Greece and its subsequent setbacks. Prior to the German campaign in France in 1940, Ciano leaked a warning of imminent invasion to neutral Belgium.

Throughout 1941 and thereafter, Ciano made derogatory and sarcastic comments about Mussolini behind his back and was surprised that these comments were reported to the Duce, who did not take them lightly; for his part, Ciano ignored well meaning friends who advised moderation. On top of that, friends and acquaintances sought his protection and aid on various matters not having to do with his official position, which in turn resulted in further caustic remarks. In addition, two relatively minor incidents wounded his overblown self-importance and vanity. One was his being excluded from a projected meeting between Mussolini and Franco. The other involved him being reprimanded for a rowdy celebration of an aviator in Bari; he wrote a letter to Mussolini stating that the Duce had "opened a wound in him which can never be closed." His own self-worth seemed to cloud his judgement, forgetting that he had acquired his position by marrying Mussolini's daughter.

In late 1942 and early 1943, following the Axis defeat in North Africa, other major setbacks on the Eastern Front, and with an Anglo-American assault on Sicily looming, Ciano turned against the doomed war and actively pushed for Italy's exit from the conflict. He was silenced by being removed from his post as foreign minister. The rest of the cabinet was removed as well on 5 February 1943. He was offered the post of ambassador to the Holy See, and presented his credentials to Pope Pius XII on 1 March. In this role he remained in Rome, watched closely by Mussolini. The regime's position had become even more unstable by the coming summer, however, and court circles were already probing the Allied commands for some sort of agreement.

On the afternoon of 24 July 1943, Mussolini summoned the Fascist Grand Council to its first meeting since 1939, prompted by the Allied invasion of Sicily. At that meeting, Mussolini announced that the Germans were thinking of evacuating the south. This led Dino Grandi to launch a blistering attack on his longtime comrade. Grandi put on the table a resolution asking King Victor Emmanuel III to resume his full constitutional powers – in effect, a vote leading to Mussolini's ousting from leadership. The motion won by an unexpectedly large margin, 19–8, with Ciano voting in favor. Mussolini's replacement was Pietro Badoglio, an Italian general in both World Wars.

Mussolini did not expect the vote to have substantive effect, and showed up for work the next morning as usual. That afternoon, the king summoned him to Villa Savoia and dismissed him from office. Upon leaving the villa, Mussolini was arrested. For the next two months he was moved from place to place to hide him and prevent his rescue by the Germans. Ultimately, Mussolini was sent to Gran Sasso, a mountain resort in Abruzzo. He was kept in complete isolation in a hotel in Campo Imperatore until rescued by German paratroopers on 12 September 1943. Mussolini then set up a puppet government in the area of northern Italy still under German occupation called the Italian Social Republic.

Death

Ciano was dismissed from his post by the new government of Italy put in place after his father-in-law was overthrown. Ciano, Edda and their three children fled to Germany on 28 August 1943 in fear of being arrested by the new Italian government. The Germans turned him over to Mussolini's administration. He was then formally arrested on charges of treason. Under German and Fascist pressure, Mussolini had Ciano imprisoned before he was tried and found guilty. After the Verona trial and sentence, on 11 January 1944, Ciano was executed by a firing squad along with 4 others (Emilio De Bono, Luciano Gottardi, Giovanni Marinelli and Carlo Pareschi) who had voted for Mussolini's ousting. As a further humiliation, the condemned men were tied to chairs and shot in the back, though Ciano managed to twist his chair around at the last minute to face the firing squad before uttering his final words, "Long live Italy!"

Ciano is remembered for his Diaries 1937–1943, a revealing daily record of his meetings with Mussolini, Hitler, Ribbentrop, foreign ambassadors and other political figures. Edda tried to barter his papers to the Germans in return for his life; Gestapo agents helped her confidant Emilio Pucci rescue some of them from Rome. Pucci was then a lieutenant in the Italian Air Force, but would find fame after the war as a fashion designer. When Hitler vetoed the plan, she hid the bulk of the papers at a clinic in Ramiola, near Medesano and on 9 January 1944, Pucci helped Edda escape to Switzerland with five diaries covering the war years which were then buried beneath a rose garden. The diary was first published in English in London in 1946, edited by Malcolm Muggeridge, covering 1939 to 1943. The complete English version was published in 2002.

Children
Gian Galeazzo and Edda Ciano had three children:
 Fabrizio Ciano, 3rd Conte di Cortellazzo e Buccari (Shanghai, 1 October 1931 – San José, Costa Rica, 8 April 2008), married to Beatriz Uzcategui Jahn, without issue. Wrote a personal memoir entitled Quando il nonno fece fucilare papà ("When Grandpa had Daddy Shot").
 Raimonda Ciano (Rome, 12 December 1933 – Rome, 24 May 1998), married to Nobile Alessandro Giunta (born 1929), son of Nobile Francesco Giunta (Piero, 1887–1971) and wife (m. Rome, 1924) Zenaida del Gallo Marchesa di Roccagiovine (Rome, 1902 – São Paulo, Brazil, 1988)
 Marzio Ciano, 4th Conte di Cortellazzo e Buccari (Rome, 18 December 1937 – 11 April 1974), married Gloria Lucchesi

In popular culture
 A number of films have depicted Ciano's life, including The Verona Trial (1962) by Carlo Lizzani, where he is played by Frank Wolff and Mussolini and I (1985) in which he was played by Anthony Hopkins.
 One of the most recognisable voices in German radio and television, Sky du Mont, played Ciano in the 1983 mini-series The Winds of War, whereas in the 1989 sequel, War and Remembrance he played a different Count, Count Claus Schenk von Stauffenberg, of the bomb plot fame.
 Raul Julia played Ciano in the 1985 television mini-series, Mussolini: The Untold Story.
 In Serbia there is a proverb: "Living like Count Ciano" – describing a flamboyant and luxurious life (Živi k'o grof Ćano/Живи к'о гроф Ћано).
 Ciano's diaries were published in 1946 and were used by the prosecution against Hitler's Foreign Minister, Joachim von Ribbentrop, during the post-war Nuremberg Trials.
 Curzio Malaparte - "Kaputt": After he wrote 'The Technique of Coup d'État', Malaparte was jailed by the Fascist regime. He was freed on the personal intervention of Count Galeazzo Ciano. In 'Kaputt' Malaparte refers to Count Ciano and his wife Edda. Like Edda Ciano, Malaparte spent time in forced exile on the island of Lipari.
 Count Ciano was mentioned by name in Sofia Vembo's song about Mussolini, his father in law.

References

Notes

Bibliography
 
 
 
 
 
 
 
 
 
 

"Galeazzo Ciano's Last Reflections before Execution." World War II Today RSS. Accessed 25 March 2015.
"Galeazzo Ciano – a Summary – History in an Hour." History in an Hour. 10 January 2014. Accessed 25 March 2015.
"Gian Galeazzo Ciano – Comando Supremo." Comando Supremo. 14 February 2010. Accessed 25 March 2015.

External links

 

1903 births
1944 deaths
People from Livorno
Mussolini family
Members of the Grand Council of Fascism
Foreign ministers of Italy
Mussolini Cabinet
Members of the Chamber of Fasces and Corporations
Politicians of Tuscany
Italian diarists
Knights of the Order of Saints Maurice and Lazarus
20th-century executions for treason
People executed by Italy by firing squad
Executed Italian people
Executed politicians
People executed by the Italian Social Republic
Recipients of the Order of the White Eagle (Poland)
20th-century diarists